Lycopodiastrum is a genus of lycophyte in the family Lycopodiaceae with only one species,  Lycopodiastrum casuarinoides. In the Pteridophyte Phylogeny Group classification of 2016 (PPG I), the genus is placed in the subfamily Lycopodioideae. Some sources do not recognize the genus, sinking it into Lycopodium. Lycopodiastrum casuarinoides is native to south-eastern Asia, from Tibet through China to Japan in the north, and from Sumatra to Sulawesi in the south.

References

Lycopodiaceae
Lycophyte genera
Monotypic plant genera